Scouting is active on Guadeloupe and on Saint Martin, connected administratively in the Territoire de Guadeloupe et Saint Martin of the Scouts et Guides de France. The Scouts of the islands participate in many Caribbean regional Scout camps, jamborees and other Scout activities. Scouting closely follows the program of the Scouts et Guides de France. The Scouts et Guides de Saint Martin and the Scouts et Guides de Guadeloupe are subsections of the larger regional entity.

The Scout emblem incorporates elements of the old coat of arms of Guadeloupe, as well as the old arms of French Guiana and Martinique.

See also
 Scouting Antiano (Dutch Scouting on the divided island of Saint Martin)
 

Guadeloupe
History of the Collectivity of Saint Martin
History of Guadeloupe
Guadeloupe, Saint Martin
Guadeloupe